Francis L. Lumsden (1913–1965) was a professional footballer, who played for Huddersfield Town, Queens Park Rangers and Burnley.

References

1914 births
1965 deaths
English footballers
Footballers from Sunderland
Association football midfielders
Huddersfield Town A.F.C. players
Queens Park Rangers F.C. players
Burnley F.C. players
English Football League players